Nguyễn Văn Công (born 1 August 1992) is a Vietnamese footballer who plays as a goalkeeper for V-League (Vietnam) club Hà Nội

Honours
Hà Nội
V.League 1: 2013, 2016, 2018, 2019, 2022; Runner-up: 2012, 2014, 2015, 2020  
Vietnamese National Cup: 2019, 2020, 2022; Runner-up: 2012, 2015, 2016
Vietnamese Super Cup: 2018, 2019, 2020, 2022; Runner-up: 2014, 2016, 2017

External links

References

1992 births
Living people
Vietnamese footballers
V.League 1 players
Hanoi FC players
People from Nghệ An province
Association football goalkeepers
Footballers at the 2014 Asian Games
Asian Games competitors for Vietnam